Lyndale can refer to any of several places and things:

Lyndale, Minneapolis, a neighborhood in Minneapolis, Minnesota, USA
Lyndale Park, a park in Minneapolis
Lyndale Avenue, a major thoroughfare in Minneapolis
Lyndale Railway, a defunct Minnesota rail company
Lyndale, Ontario, a community in Ontario, Canada
Lyndale Secondary College, in Melbourne, Australia
Lyndale Football Club, an Australian rules football team from Melbourne
Lyndale AFC, a former New Zealand association football team, now merged as part of Lynn-Avon United